Kambalapally Chandra Shekar (16 July 1965 – 19 May 2014) was an Indian cartoonist known for his political cartoons in English and in Telugu.

Early life 
He was born to a Telugu family in Suryapet, in the Nalgonda district of Andhra Pradesh. He completed his BSc degree in 1985 from Nagarjuna Government College in Nalgonda, followed by an MA in Telugu literature from Kakatiya University, Warangal.

Career 
He started his career with the Prajasakti, a left-wing newspaper, in 1989. He later worked for the New Indian Express and Andhra Jyothy. He also founded a forum for political cartoonists in Andhra Pradesh.

As of 2011, nearly 45,000 of Shekar's cartoons had appeared in English, Punjabi, Bengali, Kannada, and Marathi through his cartoon syndicate Shekartoons. His fourth book of cartoons, Gidee Telangana, was released in March 2010 in Hyderabad, India.

Shekar visited Washington DC, New York, Los Angeles, Ohio, Florida in June and July 2011 on IVLP programme on Political cartoonists among three from India. His last English cartoons book, Colours of India (2011), was launched in America and India too.

Death 

Shekar Kambalapally died on 19 May 2014 after a prolonged illness. He is survived by his wife Chandrakala and his children Nandu and Chetana.

References

External links
Shekartoons-shekar blog

2014 deaths
Indian cartoonists
1965 births
Telugu writers
Writers from Andhra Pradesh
People from Suryapet
Kakatiya University alumni